Urs (from  ‘Urs) or Urus (literal meaning wedding), is the death anniversary of a Sufi saint, usually held at the saint's dargah (shrine or tomb). In most Sufi orders such as Naqshbandiyyah, Suhrawardiyya, Chishtiyya, Qadiriyya, etc. the concept of Urs exists and is celebrated with enthusiasm. The devotees refer to their saints as lovers of God, the beloved.

Urs rituals are generally performed by the custodians of the shrine or the existing Shaikh of the silsila. The celebration of Urs ranges from Hamd to Naat and in many cases includes the singing of religious music such as qawwali. The celebration also features food samples, bazaar, and various kinds of shops.

The Urs of Khwaja Moinuddin Chishti at Dargah Sharif in Ajmer attracts more than 400,000 devotees each year and is regarded as one of the most famous urs festivals around the world.

See also
 Erwadi
 Tirupparankunram
 Manamadurai
 Pir Mangho Urs
 Urs (Ajmer)
 Madurai Maqbara
 Mela Chiraghan
 Beemapally
 Sufi Barkat Ali
 Shah Abdul Latif Bhittai

References

 
Islam in India
Islam in Pakistan
Sufism in Pakistan
Islam in Bangladesh
Sufism in Bangladesh
Arabic words and phrases
Islamic terminology